Wesley Whitehouse (born 13 March 1979) is a South African-born New Zealand tennis player.

Biography 
Whitehouse lives or has lived in between Pretoria, South Africa and Phoenix, Arizona but currently lives in Auckland, New Zealand

Career

Juniors
In 1997 he was Wimbledon Tennis Junior Champion defeating Daniel Elsner of Germany 6–3, 7–6(6). He was also a finalist in both the Australian Open and US Open juniors in the same year. He has played in many other tournaments since then.

Pro tour
Whitehouse reached a career-high singles ranking on the ATP Tour of world No. 214. He defeated Marat Safin at Indianapolis in 2006.

Junior Grand Slam finals

Singles: 3 (1 title, 2 runner-ups)

Doubles: 3 (3 runner-ups)

Performance timeline

Singles

ATP Challenger and ITF Futures finals

Singles: 12 (8–4)

Doubles: 28 (19–9)

External links
 
 

1979 births
Living people
Sportspeople from Durban
Sportspeople from Phoenix, Arizona
Sportspeople from Pretoria
South African expatriates in the United States
South African male tennis players
New Zealand male tennis players
South African people of British descent
New Zealand people of South African descent
White South African people
Wimbledon junior champions
Grand Slam (tennis) champions in boys' singles